Abdur Rab Chowdhury is a Bangladesh Awami League politician and the former Member of Parliament of Lakshmipur-4.

Career
Chowdhury was elected to parliament from Lakshmipur-4 as a Bangladesh Nationalist Party BNP candidate in 1991.

References

Awami League politicians
Living people
5th Jatiya Sangsad members
Year of birth missing (living people)